Anderson Ezequiel De Souza Filho (born 3 March 1996) is a Brazilian male BMX rider, representing his nation at international competitions. He became the first rider of his country to win a World Championship medal with a bronze at the 2018 UCI BMX World Championships.

References

External links
 
 

1996 births
Living people
BMX riders
Brazilian male cyclists
Brazilian BMX riders
Pan American Games silver medalists for Brazil
Pan American Games medalists in cycling
Cyclists at the 2015 Pan American Games
Cyclists at the 2019 Pan American Games
Medalists at the 2019 Pan American Games
Sportspeople from Minas Gerais